LaFayette Township is located in Ogle County, Illinois. As of the 2010 census, its population was 170 and it contained 72 housing units. A referendum to merge LaFayette Township with neighboring Taylor Township failed when Taylor voted against the referendum. The referendum was approved in LaFayette.

Geography

References

External links
 US Census
 City-data.com
 Midwest Government Info

Townships in Ogle County, Illinois
Townships in Illinois